George Hansen may refer to:

George V. Hansen (1930–2014), American politician from Idaho
George Hansen (Canadian football) (1934–2017), Canadian football player